SDSS J1228+1040 b is an extrasolar planetesimal orbiting the white dwarf SDSS J1228+1040.

References 

Exoplanets detected by timing
Virgo (constellation)